The Battle of Lipitsa was the decisive battle in the succession struggle over the Grand Princely throne of Vladimir-Suzdal following the death of Vsevolod the Big Nest. In the battle, fought on April 22, 1216, the forces of Mstislav the Daring and Konstantin Vsevolodovich defeated those of Konstantin's younger brothers Yuri Vsevolodovich and Yaroslav. Konstantin took the throne of Vladimir and reigned as grand prince until his death two years later.

The large-scale battle typifies the fratricidal strife that sapped the strength of the successor states to Kievan Rus' before the Mongol invasion. A detailed account of the battle first appeared in the older redaction of the Novgorodian First Chronicle, and later in the Novgorodian Fourth Chronicle, the Sofia First Chronicle, and elsewhere.

Background
The Novgorodian First Chronicle relates that Mstislav the Bold launched his campaign against his son-in-law, Yaroslav Vsevolodovich on March 1, 1216, leading a Novgorodian army into his own districts around Lake Seliger at the head of the Volga, where they were told "Go out foraging but take no heads." Sviatoslav Vsevolodovich, the fourth son of Vsevolod the Big Nest, invested Rzhevka with 10,000 men, but Mstislav and Vladimir of Pskov broke the siege with, according to the chronicle, a mere 500 men and Sviatoslav fled.  

After this encounter, Mstislav joined up with Vladimir of Smolensk and advanced toward Pereiaslavl. At this same time, detachments of Yaroslav Vsevolodovich's troops attacked a small force led by one of Mstislav's lieutenants (Yarun) near Torzhok, between Tver' and Novgorod, but Yaroslav's forces were beaten off. The survivors reported to Yaroslav who then attacked towns along the Volga before turning back to muster forces from Novgorod and then joining Yuri and Sviatoslav at Pereislavl. These forces mustered along the Kzha River.

Mstislav joined Konstantin and "the two Vladimir's" and mustered their forces on the Lipitsa River and sent a sotnik (a commander of 100) to Yuri saying they had no quarrel with him, but Yuri stood by his brother, Yaroslav. Mstislav also asked that the Novgorodians and men of Novy Torg that were part of Yaroslav's army be released and allowed to return home so that brothers and sons would not fight each other, as much of Mstislav's army was also Novgorodian. Mstislav offered peace as long as Yaroslav would return Mstislav's Novgorodian districts, but Yaroslav would not sue for peace.

The battle
The Novgorodian First Chronicle and other chronicle accounts do not relate the precise battle array (the account was written by a monk who was not familiar with strategy or tactics). The battle begins with the Novgorodians telling Mstislav that they did not want to fight on horseback but on foot, as their fathers had at an earlier battle. This pleased Mstislav (fighting on horseback may have implied a willingness to flee the battle on horse rather than standing to fight). The Novgorodians then threw off their horse breeches riding boots and ran into battle barefoot. With "the help of Saint Sophia (Holy Wisdom)," the Novgorodians drove off Yaroslav and Yuri, and the number of those killed was said to have been "countless."

The aftermath 
Yaroslav fled to Pereiaslavl and cast the Novgorodians in his army into a pit or into prison there, where large numbers of them died. Mstislav entered Pereiaslavl and the town and princely residence caught fire (the chronicle does not say if it was intentionally set alight or not). Yuri parleyed with Mstislav and agreed to withdraw from the city the following day. He withdrew to Radoliv while Mstislav and his Novgorodian army placed Konstantin on the throne in Vladimir after which Mstislav returned to Novgorod with the remnant of the Novgorodian army.

Location of the battlefield 

The location of the battlefield was a matter of some contention until 1808, when a peasant woman from Lykovo near Yuriev-Polsky on the Koloksha River discovered an ancient gilded helmet with an image of St. Theodore, the patron saint of Yaroslav Vsevolodovich. The helmet has been preserved in the Kremlin Armoury.

As a piece of rare workmanship, the helmet is usually attributed to Yaroslav. Indeed, the chronicler noted that Yaroslav had fled the battlefield without his armour and arrived in Vladimir having nothing on but a shirt. Actor Nikolai Cherkasov, when playing the part of Yaroslav's son Alexander Nevsky in the eponymous film, wore a replica of this helmet.

References

Vladimir-Suzdal
Lipitsa
1216 in Europe

Lipitsa
Lipitsa